Oregon Inlet Station is a historic lifesaving station located near Rodanthe, Dare County, North Carolina.  It was built in 1897 by the United States Life-Saving Service and remodeled in 1933 and 1970.  It is a 1 1/2-story, Shingle Style rectangular frame building with a lookout tower.  It has a porch that surrounds the building.  It was one of seven lifesaving stations established on the Outer Banks of North Carolina in 1874, to serve the ships that were lost in the treacherous waters off the North Carolina coast.

It was listed on the National Register of Historic Places in 1975.

References

External links
 

Historic American Buildings Survey in North Carolina
Government buildings on the National Register of Historic Places in North Carolina
Shingle Style architecture in North Carolina
Government buildings completed in 1897
Buildings and structures in Dare County, North Carolina
National Register of Historic Places in Dare County, North Carolina
1897 establishments in North Carolina